Mukaradeeb or Makr al-Theeb is a small village in Iraq near the Syrian border.

See also 

 Mukaradeeb wedding party massacre

References

External links 
 http://www.guardian.co.uk/international/story/0,,1223563,00.html

Populated places in Al Anbar Governorate